The Football tournament of the 2014 Lusophony Games took place in Goa, India at the Fatorda Stadium and Tilak Maidan. The tournament was played from 19 to 28 January 2014. There was only men's competition and U20 teams represented their nations.

Group stage

Group A

Group B

Semi-finals

Bronze Medal

Gold Medal

See also
ACOLOP
Lusophony Games
2014 Lusophony Games

References

football
2014
2014
2013–14 in Sri Lankan football
2013–14 in Indian football
2014 in Macau football
2014 in African football